Caleb Finck is an American farmer, businessman, and politician serving as a member of the South Dakota House of Representatives from the 21st district. He assumed office in 2019.

Background 
Finck was born in Tripp, South Dakota, and earned a Bachelor of Science degree from South Dakota State University, where he studied communication, education, and agricultural leadership.

References 

Living people
Republican Party members of the South Dakota House of Representatives
People from Tripp County, South Dakota
South Dakota State University alumni
Farmers from South Dakota
Year of birth missing (living people)
21st-century American politicians